Afro Blue is a jazz album by musician McCoy Tyner, released on November 13, 2007. It compiles recordings from his albums on Telarc Records, documenting his eight-year tenure with the label.

Track listing
 "Afro Blue" (Mongo Santamaría) – 12:23
 "If I Should Lose You" (Leo Robin, Ralph Rainger) – 6:24
 "You Taught My Heart to Sing" (McCoy Tyner) – 5:39
 "If I Were a Bell" (Frank Loesser) – 7:50
 "Summertime" (George Gershwin) – 4:51
 "The Night Has a Thousand Eyes" (Jerome Brainin) – 4:52
 "Blue Bossa" (Kenny Dorham) – 6:51
 "Carriba" (McCoy Tyner) – 5:38

1 & 7 from McCoy Tyner and the Latin All-Stars (1999)

6 & 8 from McCoy Tyner with Stanley Clarke and Al Foster (2000)

3 & 5 from Jazz Roots (2000)

4 from Land of Giants (2003)

2 from Illuminations (2004)

Personnel
 McCoy Tyner – piano
 Johnny Almendra – timbales (1,7)
 Gary Bartz – saxophone (1, 2, 7)
 Ignacio Berroa – drums (1, 7)
 Giovanni Hidalgo – percussion (1, 7)
 Claudio Roditi – trumpet, flugelhorn (1, 7)
 Avery Sharpe – bass (1, 7)
 Steve Turre – trombone, shells (1, 7)
 Dave Valentin – flute (1, 7)
 Christian McBride – bass (2)
 Lewis Nash – drums (2)
 Bobby Hutcherson – vibes (4)
 Charnett Moffett – bass (4)
 Eric Harland – drums (4)
 Stanley Clarke – acoustic bass, electric bass (6, 8)
 Al Foster – drums (6, 8)

References

2007 compilation albums
McCoy Tyner compilation albums
Telarc Records compilation albums